Banjar Station (BJR) is a railway station located in Hegarsari, Pataruman, Banjar, West Java, Indonesia. The station has six railway tracks.

Services
The following is a list of train services at the Banjar Station.

Passenger services
 Executive class
 Mixed class
 Pangandaran, Destination of  
 Economy class

Freight
The station was once the junction where the scenic railway line to Pangandaran beach originated. Despite its popularity among tourists, the line was closed in 1982 as the cost far outweighed its revenues. Since then there has been on and off effort to reactivate the line.

References

External links
 

Banjar, West Java
railway stations in West Java
railway stations opened in 1894